Sidney Beckerman may refer to:

 Sidney Beckerman (movie producer) (1920–2008), American film producer
 Sidney Beckerman (musician) (1919–2007), American clarinettist

See also
Beckerman (surname)